Incilius tacanensis (common name: Volcan Tacana toad) is a species of toad in the family Bufonidae. It is found in western Guatemala and eastern Chiapas (Mexico). Its name refers to Volcán Tacaná, its type locality.
Its natural habitat is premontane tropical forest. It is assumed to be a stream breeder. It is a rare species threatened by habitat loss, and potentially, chytridiomycosis.

References

tacanensis
Amphibians of Guatemala
Amphibians of Mexico
Amphibians described in 1952
Taxonomy articles created by Polbot